Gemona del Friuli is a comune (municipality) in the Province of Udine in the Italian region Friuli Venezia Giulia, located about  northwest of Trieste and about  northwest of Udine.

The municipality of Gemona del Friuli contains the frazioni (subdivisions, mainly villages and hamlets) Campagnola, Campolessi, Maniaglia, Ospedaletto, Godo, Centro Storico, Stalis, Taviele and Taboga.

Gemona del Friuli borders the following municipalities: Artegna, Bordano, Buja, Lusevera, Montenars, Osoppo, Trasaghis and Venzone.

History

Evidence of human occupation in Gemona goes back to prehistoric times. The town occupies a key point on the road from Italy to Austria, and there are traces of Celtic occupation around the year 500 BCE.

The area was subject to various invasions in the period 166–750, including Huns, Marcomanni, Ostrogoths, Visigoths and Lombards, who had it as a stronghold from about 558. Lombard historian Paul the Deacon mentions it in 611 as an "impregnable castle". From the fall of the Lombard Kingdom of Italy until 952 Gemona was under Carolingian rulers. During this period the castle was built, the modern town growing around it.

From 776, Gemona became an important part of the Patriarchate of Aquileia. In the 12th century Gemona was an autonomous commune: in 1184 the Emperor Frederick Barbarossa granted a charter for the town's market. In the 13th and 14th centuries it returned to the Patriarchate, until, in 1420, that state was absorbed by the Republic of Venice.

In 1797 French troops under Napoleon defeated the Venetian Republic: in 1798, after the Treaty of Campoformio, Gemona came under Austrian rule. Following a plebiscite in 1866, Gemona became part of the newly unified Kingdom of Italy.
 
The present town is medieval in origin but was badly damaged in the 1976 Friuli earthquake. Restoration began the same year, and now the town has been largely restored. The castle is currently under reconstruction.

Main sights
Gemona's main attraction is the  medieval cathedral (Duomo), dating to the 14th century, with its massive campanile (freestanding bell tower) of the same period. The collections of its Museo Civico include a Madonna and Child by Cima da Conegliano.

Transport
 Gemona del Friuli railway station

Twin towns
 Velden am Wörther See, Austria
 Laakirchen, Austria
 Foligno, Italy, since 2001

Notable people
 
 
Alessandro Cicutti (born 1987), footballer

References

External links

 Official  website

Cities and towns in Friuli-Venezia Giulia
Hilltowns in Friuli-Venezia Giulia
Castles in Italy